The 2003 East Renfrewshire Council election for the East Renfrewshire Council took place on 1 May 2003, alongside elections to Scotland's various other councils.

Aggregate results

References

2003 Scottish local elections
2003